The San Angelo Colts were a professional baseball team based in San Angelo, Texas, in the United States. The Colts were most recently a member of United League Baseball, an independent professional league which was not affiliated with Major League Baseball or Minor League Baseball.  The Colts played their home games at Foster Field.

The team experienced declining attendance in later years and announced on July 2, 2014 that it had filed for Chapter 11 bankruptcy protection.  Although it was stated at the time that operations would not be affected, the team announced on August 11, 2014 that the final 8 games of the 2014 season would not be played.

The combination of the Colts' financial issues, the loss of the home stadium of the Fort Worth Cats and low attendance led to the folding of United League Baseball, and all of its member teams, in January 2015.

Team Record

League All-Stars

Players
2000
 Gabe Duross, 1B
 Guy Giuffre, DH
 Toby McDermott, LHP
 Chad Tredaway, 3B

2001
 Manny Lopez, OF
 Will Roland, SS
 Franklin Taveras, UTL

2002
 Mike Kirkpatrick, OF
 Marc Mirizzi, SS
 Nestor Smith, OF
 Gilbert Landestoy P

2006
 John Anderson, IF
 Brian Baker, OF
 Kevin Bass, DH
 Jason Crosland, IF
 Adam Hanson, RHP
 Brantley Jordan, LHP
 Tony Sanguinetti, C

2007
 Josh Allan, C
 Stephen Artz, RHP
 Jason Crosland, 1B
 Ronnie Gaines, OF
 Andres Rodriguez, 3B
 Chace Vacek, RHP
 Madison Edwards, OF

2008
 Bryan Frichter, OF
 Luke Massetti, RHP
 Andres Rodriguez, 1B
 José Torres, OF

Coaches
2000–2001
 Dan Madsen, Manager
2006
 Doc Edwards, Manager

2008–2009
 Doc Edwards, Manager

Historical use of the name

The original San Angelo Colts played in the Class D West Texas League in 1922.  The team had started out as the San Angelo Bronchos the year before.

In 1948, another team using the Colts name began play in the Longhorn League.  When the league changed names to the Southwestern League in 1956, the Colts stayed on board, but folded before the start of the 1957 season.

The Colts had been a part of independent baseball since 2000 with the Texas–Louisiana League (2000–2001), Central Baseball League (2002–2005), United League Baseball (2006–2010) and North American League (2011–2012).

Notes

External links
 San Angelo Colts website
 Official United League Baseball site

North American League teams
United League Baseball teams
Sports in San Angelo, Texas
Professional baseball teams in Texas
2000 establishments in Texas
2014 disestablishments in Texas
Baseball teams established in 2000
Defunct independent baseball league teams
Baseball teams disestablished in 2014
Defunct baseball teams in Texas